Léonard Sylvain Julien (Jules) Sandeau (19 February 1811 – 24 April 1883) was a French novelist.

Early life 
Sandeau was born at Aubusson (Creuse), and was sent to Paris to study law, but spent much of his time in unruly behaviour with other students. He met George Sand, then Madame Dudevant, at Le Coudray in the house of a friend, and when she came to Paris in 1831 they had a relationship. The intimacy did not last long, but it produced Rose et Blanche (1831), a novel written together under the pseudonym J. Sand, from which George Sand took her famous pseudonym.

Major works 
Sandeau continued to produce novels and plays for nearly fifty years. His major works are:
Marianna (1839), in which he draws a portrait of George Sand
Le Docteur Herbeau (1841)
Catherine (1845)
Mademoiselle de la Seiglière (1848), a successful picture of society under Louis Philippe, dramatized in 1851
Madeleine (1848)
La Chasse au roman (1849)
Sacs et parchemins (1851)
La Maison de Penarvan (1858)
La Roche aux mouettes (1871)

The famous play, Le Gendre de M. Poirier, is one of several which he wrote in collaboration with Émile Augier—the novelist usually contributing the story and the dramatist the theatrical form. Sandeau's novels were less popular than his plays.

Later life 
Sandeau had been made conservateur of the Mazarin library in 1853, elected to the Académie française in 1858, and appointed librarian of St Cloud in 1859. At the suppression of this latter office, after the fall of the Second French Empire, he was pensioned.

Death 
Jules Sandeau died in Paris in 1883 and was buried in the Cimetière du Montparnasse.

References

External links
 
 
 
 La Chasse au roman

1811 births
1883 deaths
People from Creuse
Members of the Académie Française
Burials at Montparnasse Cemetery
19th-century French novelists
French male novelists
19th-century French male writers